Temascaltepec de  González (formally: Temascaltepec de González, for Plutarco González) is a city and seat of the municipality of Temascaltepec located in south of the State of Mexico in Mexico. Temascaltepec comes from the Náhuatl "temazcalli," which means "steam bath," and "tepetl," which means "hill." The Matlatzincas named the area "Cocalostoc," which means 'cave of crows'.

History

The first people known to live in Temascaltepec area were the prehispanic group Matlatzincas and probably founded the village were the modern town stands. During the Spanish conquest, it was delegated to Andrés de Tapia in 1556, with its first church built in 1559. The town grew after the discovery of silver deposits in 1545, and the area was a rich provider of minerals, including silver during the colonial era until after the Mexican War of Independence.  In 1858, by decree of the state government, Temascaltepec was elevated to the category of town, and in 1861 was named Temascaltepec de González in honor of Plutarco González, a leader in the time of La Reforma. However, it is still known simply as Temascaltepec.  The population of the town as of 2005 was 2,253.

Notable residents
José Mariano Muciño Juárez - naturalist (1757– )
Fernando de Portugal - miner  
Lic. Hernando Caballero - miner 
Gonzalo Castañeda - doctor, teacher, writer (1867–1947)
Reynaldo Escobar Castañeda - teacher, doctor, writer (1897–1960)
Alfredo Borboa Reyes - lawyer, municipal chronicler (1930– )

References

Temascaltepec
Populated places in the State of Mexico
Municipality seats in the State of Mexico
Nahua settlements
Matlatzinca settlements